The fifteenth season of the American reality television show, The Voice premiered on September 24, 2018, on NBC. Adam Levine, Kelly Clarkson, and Blake Shelton returned as coaches (fifteenth, second, and fifteenth seasons respectively) from the previous season. Jennifer Hudson, who last coached in season 13, returned for her second season replacing Alicia Keys. For the first time in its history, the show featured a fifth coach, Kelsea Ballerini, who selected contestants to participate in The Comeback Stage.

While the Block made a return from the last season, this season introduced "The Comeback Stage", a digital companion series where six artists eliminated from the Blind Auditions coached by Kelsea Ballerini pitted in a series of Battles for a place in the Top 13.

Chevel Shepherd was named winner of this season, marking Kelly Clarkson's second win as a coach, and making her the first female coach to win multiple seasons (and the third overall coach, after Shelton and Levine). Clarkson also became the second coach in the show's history to win multiple consecutive seasons of The Voice, after Shelton who won from seasons two to four of the show.

Coaches and hosts

On May 11, 2018, Kelly Clarkson confirmed she would return alongside coach veterans, Adam Levine, and Blake Shelton with Jennifer Hudson who returns after a one-season hiatus. Carson Daly returned for his fifteenth season as host. It was announced on September 10 that Kelsea Ballerini would become a fifth coach, mentoring unsuccessful auditioners on an online version in a new round called The Comeback Stage. Coincidentally, Clarkson and Hudson are current talk show hosts.

This season's advisors for the Battle Rounds were CeeLo Green for Team Adam, Thomas Rhett for Team Kelly, Halsey for Team Jennifer, and Keith Urban for Team Blake. Mariah Carey was assigned as a mentor for all teams during the knockouts.

Teams
Color key

Blind auditions
Color key

Episode 1 (September 24)

Episode 2 (September 25)

Episode 3 (October 1)

Episode 4 (October 2)

Episode 5 (October 8)

Episode 6 (October 9)

Episode 7 (October 15)

The Battles 
The second half of the Battle Rounds started on October 15. Season fifteen's advisors include: CeeLo Green for Team Adam, Thomas Rhett for Team Kelly, Halsey for Team Jennifer, and Keith Urban for Team Blake. The coaches can steal two losing artists from other coaches. Contestants who win their battle or are stolen by another coach will advance to the Knockout rounds.

During a commercial break before the Battles Part 1's last pairing, four coaches give the waiting audience an impromptu performance with an acapella version of The Golden Girls theme song - "Thank You for Being a Friend".Color key:The Knockouts
The Knockouts round started on October 29. The coaches can each steal one losing artist from another team and save one artist who lost their Knockout on their own team. The top 24 contestants then moved on to the Live Playoffs. Mariah Carey served as the advisor to contestants from all teams in this round. Cody Ray Raymond from Team Kelly dropped out from the competition due to personal reasons; Clarkson grouped three of her members into one knockout, with two contestants from the trio advancing, with the third being declared the loser, just like on the eighth season. This episode on October 30 is in memory of a finalist of season 1, Beverly McClellan who died on stage 3c endometrial cancer.Color key:The Comeback Stage
For this season, the show added a brand new phase of competition called The Comeback Stage, exclusive to The Voice mobile app, The Voice YouTube channel, Instagram TV, Facebook, Twitter, and NBC.com. After failing to turn a chair in the blind auditions, artists had the chance to be selected by fifth coach Kelsea Ballerini to become a member of her six-person team. The Comeback Stage consists of three rounds. In the first, it is the Battle round. Artists would be paired up and given a solo song to perform for Kelsea's favor (similar to the Knockouts). In the second, it is the Comeback's Knockout round. The three remaining artists would be given another song to sing, with two of them advancing to the final stage. The third and final stage is run in conjunction with the Live Playoffs. The two remaining artists perform live for America's votes in the first Twitter Instant Save of the season, with the winner officially joining one of the four main teams of their choosing as a part of the Top 13.

The Battles

The Knockouts

Live Playoffs

Live showsColor key:'

Week 1: Live Playoffs (Nov 12 & 13)
The Live Playoffs comprised episodes 15 and 16. The 24 artists perform, with two artists from each team advancing based on the viewers' vote, and each coach completing their respective teams with their own choice. The Monday night broadcast featured all teams and the Tuesday night broadcast featured the results, along with the final Comeback Stage matchup.

Ballerini was added as the fifth coach and has coached six artists who did not turn a chair in the Blind Auditions to help them get a second chance to return to the competition for the live shows. They had their own battles and knockouts, and only two, Ayanna Joni and Lynnea Moorer, competed via America's vote (similar to the Instant Save) for a place in the Top 13. Moorer was revealed the winner of "The Comeback Stage", and joined Team Kelly on the Top 13.

With the elimination of Kameron Marlowe, this marked the first time since the seventh season that Levine did not include the artist that he stole in the Knockouts in his top three, as Brian Johnson, Amy Vachal, Shalyah Fearing, Josh Gallagher, Lilli Passero, Adam Cunningham, and Sharane Calister were all either chosen by him or voted into his top three by the public in the eighth, ninth, tenth, eleventh, twelfth, thirteenth, and fourteenth seasons, respectively.

Week 2: Top 13 (Nov 19 & 20)
This week's theme was “Dedications”. The three artists with the fewest votes competed for an Instant Save, with two leaving the competition.

This season, the live show voting mechanism has changed. iTunes purchases of the singles released by the top 13 artists were instead replaced with Apple Music streams which now count as votes. This also affected the iTunes multiplier bonus from past seasons. This time, the artist (and only one) with the most streams after the closing of the voting window would receive a fivefold multiplier.

The Apple Music multiplier was awarded to Reagan Strange. The singles charted in the top 10 this week was Kirk Jay (#10).

Week 3: Top 11 (Nov 26 & 27)
The theme for this week was "Fan Night", meaning that the artists performed songs chosen by the fans. The two artists with the fewest votes will compete for an Instant Save, with one leaving the competition.
The Apple Music multiplier was awarded to Strange, while two artists had singles reached Top 10 on iTunes (Kennedy Holmes (#7) and Kymberli Joye (#8).

Week 4: Top 10 (Dec 3 & 4)
The Apple Music multiplier bonus was awarded to Chris Kroeze, while Sarah Grace (#3) and Kirk Jay (#4) had singles reached Top 10 on iTunes.

With the advancement of Chevel Shepherd, Kymberli Joye, and Sarah Grace, Clarkson became the first female coach to get more than two artists on her team to the semifinals. With the elimination of Dave Fenley, this marked the first time since the eleventh season that Shelton lost any members of his team prior to the semifinals, and the second time out of the past seven seasons in which such an event occurred, having kept his entire team intact up until that point in the competition in the ninth, tenth, twelfth, thirteenth, and fourteenth seasons.

Week 5: Semifinals (Dec 10 & 11)
The Top 8 performed on Monday, December 10, 2018, with the results following on Tuesday, December 11, 2018. The top three artists immediately advanced on to the finale, while the bottom two artists with the fewest votes were immediately eliminated and the middle three contended for the remaining spot in the next finale via the Instant Save. Clarkson brought in Brynn Cartelli to help her team in the rehearsals. In addition to their individual songs, each artist performed a duet mashup with another artist in the competition, but unlike the past two seasons, these duets were not available for purchase on iTunes.

The Apple Music multiplier bonus was awarded to Kroeze, while singles for Shepherd (#4) and Jay (#6) charting in at Top 10 on iTunes.

With the elimination of Strange, Levine no longer had any artists left on his team.  This was the second season in a row (and the fourth time overall) in which none of his artists represented him in the finale. With the advancements of Shepherd and Holmes, this season also marked the second consecutive season in which two female coaches were represented in the finale, with Shepherd representing Clarkson and Holmes representing Hudson.  Holmes's advancement also marked Hudson's first American season to have a finalist, after not being represented in the thirteenth season.  With the advancement of Kroeze, this season marks the first time that an artist who was defeated in Knockout round but was saved by his coach went on to compete in the finale.

Week 6: Finale (Dec. 17 & 18)
The final 4 performed on Monday, December 17, 2018, with the final results following on Tuesday, December 18, 2018. Each finalist performed a solo cover song, a holiday-themed duet with their coach, and an original song.
The contestant's performances reached the top 10 on iTunes were Shepherd (#1 & #9), Kroeze (#3) and Jay (#2, #4 & #5).

Elimination chart

Overall
Color key
Artist's info

Result details

Teams
Color key
Artist's info

Results details

Controversies

Top 10 Elimination
The "Instant Save" during the Top 10 garnered controversy. The bottom group for that week featured three contestants: Dave Fenley (Team Blake), DeAndre Nico (Team Adam), and Reagan Strange (Team Adam). Adam Levine made controversial comments that some fans felt were unfair to Nico, expressing their concern that Levine was "throwing him under the bus" in favor of Strange, who was unable to perform due to "health reasons." Following Nico's performance, Levine chose to advocate for Strange, telling viewers to vote for her despite her not being able to perform, and only briefly touched upon Nico's performance. After the commercial break, fellow coach Kelly Clarkson came in defense of Levine's speech while applauding Nico to console him and clarified that she was aware of Levine's situation for his team and that he was just disappointed that Strange couldn't sing onstage to save herself as it is what occurred the outcome to this issue. The vote was reported close, with Strange advancing by one percent (38% to Nico's 37%).

Following Strange's advancement, fans criticized Levine online for his "lack of respect" towards Nico in a pivotal moment, and many blamed him for the elimination. Some fans cited that Strange's advancement over Nico and Fenley was unfair because she did not perform, while Nico expressed frustration with Levine's behavior in a later interview, saying Levine "sold [him] out." Levine briefly addressed the controversy the following week by having Nico and Strange Facetime. However, some fans felt the controversy was not fully addressed, as both Nico and his mother, Johnna, revealed on Twitter and Instagram that Levine had never actually apologized.  The following week, Strange was eliminated. Some fans criticized her elimination, expressing they felt her elimination was the result of the controversy and Levine's handling of Nico's elimination, while other fans found her elimination a perfectly fair compensation for Nico's elimination.

The controversy had lasting effects which rolled over into the following season. By the time the live Cross-Battles arrived, Levine's team was whittled down from eight members to two, with Levine managing to add two more members due to a save and a steal, likely due to angry fans and voters refusing to vote for Team Adam members, and the remaining members would later be voted out over the following two weeks. This controversy might have also factored into Levine's departure the following year.

Ratings

References

External links

Season 15
2018 American television seasons